Padanaram is a village in Massachusetts, United States.

Padanaram may also refer to:
 Padanaram, Indiana, an intentional community in Indiana, United States
 Padan-aram or Paddan Aram, the part of Aram that lay in the Euphrates River valley in the Bible
 Padanaram, Angus, a location in Scotland, U.K.

See also
 Paadasaram, a 1978 Indian Malayalam-language film